The girls' doubles tournament of the 2018 Badminton Asia Junior Championships was held from July 18 to 22. The defending champion of the last edition were Baek Ha-na and Lee Yu-rim from South Korea. The top seeds in this event this year are the returning silver medallists Liu Xuanxuan / Xia Yuting from China, Agatha Imanuela / Siti Fadia Silva Ramadhanti of Indonesia seeded in the second place.

Seeded

 Liu Xuanxuan / Xia Yuting (semifinals)
 Agatha Imanuela / Siti Fadia Silva Ramadhanti (semifinals)
 Pearly Tan Koong Le / Toh Ee Wei (final)
 Febriana Dwipuji Kusuma / Ribka Sugiarto (champions)
 Li Zi-qing / Teng Chun-hsun (third round)
 Chen Yingying / Zhang Shuxian (third round)
 Metya Inayah Cindiani / Febby Valencia Dwijayanti Gani (quarterfinals)
 Indah Cahya Sari Jamil / Lisa Ayu Kusumawati (quarterfinals)

Draw

Finals

Top half

Section 1

Section 2

Bottom half

Section 3

Section 4

References

External links 
Main Draw

2018 Badminton Asia Junior Championships
Junior
Bad